Margaret Rodgers may refer to: 

Margaret Rodgers (deaconess) (1939–2014), Australian Anglican church leader
Margaret Catharine Rodgers (born 1964), American federal jurist

See also
Margaret Rogers (disambiguation)